Terry Katsma (born April 23, 1958) is an American Republican politician and businessman. He has been a member of the Wisconsin State Assembly since 2015, representing Sheboygan County.

Early life and education 
Katsma was born in Sheboygan, Wisconsin. He graduated from Sheboygan County Christian High School. He then received his bachelor's degree in business administration from Dordt College and his master's degree in business administration from Marquette University.

Business career 
He worked in the banking business, having served as the senior vice president at Oostburg State Bank and later president and chief executive officer. Katsma had served on the Oostburg Village Board and is a Republican.

Wisconsin state legislature 
On November 4, 2014, Katsma was elected to the Wisconsin State Assembly after defeating Democrat Terry Van Akkeren in the general election. He has been re-elected to the state legislature in 2016, 2018 and 2020.

Katsma is seeking his fifth term to the State Assembly in the 2022 election.

References

External links 
 Representative Terry Katsma at Wisconsin Legislature
 Campaign website
 Terry Katsma at Ballotpedia

1958 births
Living people
People from Oostburg, Wisconsin
Dordt University alumni
Marquette University alumni
Businesspeople from Wisconsin
Wisconsin city council members
Republican Party members of the Wisconsin State Assembly
21st-century American politicians